Dechibeta Hot Springs are hot springs in the Cabecar people's indigenous territory at Valle de la Estrella, Talamanca Range, a province of Limón, Costa Rica. Hot springs found here reach temperatures of 55 degrees Celsius in some points.

Little biological research has been done in this area where North American and South American flora overlaps.

References

Bodies of water of Costa Rica
Geography of Limón Province
Hot springs of North America
Bodies of water of Central America